Mount Arrowsmith is the highest mountain east of Port Alberni on Vancouver Island. Its dominant rock is basalt.  The mountain is contained within the Mount Arrowsmith Biosphere Region and as of September 18, 2009 is designated part of  hectare Mt. Arrowsmith Massif Regional Park.

History
The mountain is named kał-ka-č’ałḥ (Kulth-ka-choolth) meaning Jagged Points Facing Upward in the Hupacasath First Nation and Coast Salish languages. 

The first recorded ascent by colonists was made by botanist John Macoun in 1887.  Macoun was a botanist to the Geological Survey of Canada.  Mount Waddington was first seen from the peak of Mount Arrowsmith by Don and Phyllis Munday in 1925 (see also Mount Munday).  The mountain was named about 1853 by Captain Richards for cartographers, Aaron Arrowsmith and his nephew John Arrowsmith.

Biogeoclimatic Zones
Mount Arrowsmith has three main biogeoclimatic zones.

See also 
List of mountains of British Columbia

References

External links

Judges Route, Club Tread

Alberni Valley
One-thousanders of British Columbia
Biosphere reserves of Canada
Vancouver Island Ranges